Mount Meany is a prominent  mountain summit located deep within Olympic National Park in Jefferson County of Washington state. With a good eye and clear weather, the top of the mountain can be seen from the visitor center at Hurricane Ridge. The nearest neighbor is Mount Noyes less than one mile to the south, and the nearest higher peak is Circe (6,847 ft) on Mount Olympus,  to the northwest. There are scrambling routes on the east side, via Noyes-Meany col, and via the ridge from Mount Queets. Due to heavy winter snowfalls, Mount Meany supports several small glaciers on its north and east slopes, despite its modest elevation. Precipitation runoff from the mountain drains into the headwaters of both the Elwha and Queets Rivers.

History

The present day Mt. Meany - Mt. Queets area was referred to as Mt. Mesachie on the 1896 Gilman National Geographic Map. The word mesachie is from the Chinook Jargon and means wicked.

The mountain was named during the 1889-90 Seattle Press Expedition to honor Edmond S. Meany (1862-1935), at that time an employee of the Seattle Press who arranged the meeting between the expedition's newspaper sponsor, with Canadian James Halbold Christie, the leader of group of five which ascended the Elwha River and descended the North Fork Quinault River. Meany later became a renowned scholar and professor at the University of Washington, a Washington state legislator, and also a mountain climber who served as president of The Mountaineers.

The first ascent of the mountain was made August 8, 1907, by Asahel Curtis, Lorenz Nelson, and Peter McGregor.

Climate

Based on the Köppen climate classification, Mount Meany is located in the marine west coast climate zone of western North America. Most weather fronts originate in the Pacific Ocean, and travel northeast toward the Olympic Mountains. As fronts approach, they are forced upward by the peaks of the Olympic Range, causing them to drop their moisture in the form of rain or snowfall (Orographic lift). As a result, the Olympics experience high precipitation, especially during the winter months. During winter months, weather is usually cloudy, but, due to high pressure systems over the Pacific Ocean that intensify during summer months, there is often little or no cloud cover during the summer. In terms of favorable weather, the best months for climbing are June through September.

See also

 Olympic Mountains

References

External links
 
 Mount Meany weather: Mountain Forecast

Olympic Mountains
Mountains of Washington (state)
Mountains of Jefferson County, Washington
Landforms of Olympic National Park
North American 2000 m summits